The Tamalpais Union High School District or TUHSD provides high school education to students residing in ten elementary districts in central and southern Marin County, California and parts of West Marin. The headquarters are on the property of Redwood High School in Larkspur, California.

Communities served
They are: Bolinas-Stinson Union, Kentfield, Lagunitas, Larkspur-Corte Madera, Mill Valley, Nicasio, Reed Union, Ross, Ross Valley and Sausalito Marin City school districts. , District enrollment was 3,921 students. The union high school district lies within the Marin Community College District.

Schools
The three comprehensive high schools and the communities in their attendance areas (with ZIP Codes) are:
 Tamalpais High School, Mill Valley; opened 1908; serves Bolinas (94924), Mill Valley (94941), Sausalito & Marin City (94965), Stinson Beach (94970)
 Archie Williams High School, San Anselmo; opened 1951 as Sir Francis Drake High School; serves Fairfax (94930), Forest Knolls (94933), Lagunitas (94938). Nicasio (94946), San Anselmo (94960), San Geronimo (94963), Woodacre (94973)
 Redwood High School, Larkspur; opened 1958; serves Belvedere (94920), Corte Madera (94925), Greenbrae & Kentfield (94904), Larkspur (94939), Ross (94957), Tiburon (94920)

Two alternative high schools serve the entire district:
 San Andreas High School (continuation high school), Larkspur, California
 Tamiscal High School (independent study), Larkspur, California

Tamalpais, Redwood, and Archie Williams are California Distinguished Schools. San Andreas has been recognized by the State of California as a Model Continuation School.

References

External links

School districts in Marin County, California
Corte Madera, California
Larkspur, California
Mill Valley, California
San Anselmo, California
Sausalito, California
Tiburon, California
1908 establishments in California
School districts established in 1908